In Greek mythology, Dynamene ("the bringer") was a Nereid or sea-nymph, one of the 50 daughters of the "Old Man of the Sea" Nereus and the Oceanid Doris. Her name, a participle, means "she who can, the capable one." She, along with her sister Pherusa, was associated with the might and power of great ocean swells. Dynamene had the ability to appear and disappear rapidly. Some variations of her name were Dyomene and Dinamene

Mythology 
In Homer's Iliad, Dynamene and her other sisters appear to Thetis when she cries out in sympathy for the grief of Achilles at the slaying of his friend Patroclus.

Popular culture
Dynamene is also the name of the beautiful widow in Christopher Fry's 1946 comedy A Phoenix Too Frequent, a character and plot derived from Petronius. After the premature death of her husband Virilius, Dynamene along with her maid Doto proposes to starve herself to death and follow him to Hades.  They are rudely interrupted from their purpose by the handsome soldier Tegeus who is meant to be guarding six dead bodies outside.  With Tegeus's charm and adoration Dynamene is able to save herself from an untimely fate.

Notes

References 
 
 Apollodorus, The Library with an English Translation by Sir James George Frazer, F.B.A., F.R.S. in 2 Volumes, Cambridge, MA, Harvard University Press; London, William Heinemann Ltd. 1921. ISBN 0-674-99135-4. Online version at the Perseus Digital Library. Greek text available from the same website.
 Gaius Julius Hyginus, Fabulae from The Myths of Hyginus translated and edited by Mary Grant. University of Kansas Publications in Humanistic Studies. Online version at the Topos Text Project.
 Hesiod, Theogony from The Homeric Hymns and Homerica with an English Translation by Hugh G. Evelyn-White, Cambridge, MA.,Harvard University Press; London, William Heinemann Ltd. 1914. Online version at the Perseus Digital Library. Greek text available from the same website.
 Homer, The Iliad with an English Translation by A.T. Murray, Ph.D. in two volumes. Cambridge, MA., Harvard University Press; London, William Heinemann, Ltd. 1924. . Online version at the Perseus Digital Library.
 Homer, Homeri Opera in five volumes. Oxford, Oxford University Press. 1920. . Greek text available at the Perseus Digital Library.
 Kerényi, Carl, The Gods of the Greeks, Thames and Hudson, London, 1951.

Nereids
Deities in the Iliad